Kayli Barker (born July 25, 1997) is an American race car driver based in Las Vegas, Nevada. In October 2013 at the Bullring at the Las Vegas Motor Speedway, Barker became the first female champion of one of the track's three NASCAR classes. For the 2014 racing season, Barker joined the Sigma Racing team along with Jay Beasley and Donny St Ours, racing in the super late model division. Her crew chief for racing her super late model is Dana Stahl.

Barker is the daughter of Ron Barker who raced super stocks at the Las Vegas Motor Speedway. She is the spokesperson for Project 150, a Las Vegas nonprofit organization that helps local homeless, disadvantaged and displaced high school students stay in school and graduate.

Racing titles 

 2013: First female to win a NASCAR championship at the Bullring at Las Vegas Speedway, wins Super Stock championship 
 2013: Rookie of the Year, Super Late Division
 2012: New Record for Youngest Female to win NASCAR Whelen All-American Series Super Stock Division
 2012: Bullring Spring Sizzler champion
 2012: Rookie of the Year, Super Stock Division
 2011: Finished 4th Las Vegas Motor Speedway Open Competition
 2011: Qualified 10th out of 46 cars at the Street Stock Shootout at Orange Show Speedway
 2011: Charger Division- Finished 9th, 5th, 7th, and 6th in Four Local Races
 2011: 25 Wins- 18 in a row, 36 of 40 (top 3) 38 of 40 (top 5)
 2011: 4th in National Points, Top Female
 2011: 1st Female to Win Two Track Championships in Las Vegas History
 2011: Las Vegas Motor Speedway Bullring Bandolero Outlaw Champion
 2011: Nevada State Bandolero Outlaw Champion
 2010: 3rd at Las Vegas Motor Speedway Bandolero Outlaw Division
 2009: 11 wins, 31 out of 37 (3rd place), 36 of 37 (top 5)
 2009: 10th in National Points, First Female to Reach Top 10
 2009: Youngest Female Track Champion in Las Vegas History
 2009: LVMS Bullring Bandolero Bandit Champion
 2009: Nevada State Bandolero Bandit Champion
 2008: 6th at Las Vegas Motor Speedway
 2007: 7th at Las Vegas Motor Speedway
 2006: 7th at Las Vegas Motor Speedway
 2006: Nevada State Bandolero Bandit Champion

See also

References

Further reading
 SI.com - Faces in the Crowd

External links
 

1997 births
Living people
American racing drivers
American female racing drivers
21st-century American women
Racing drivers from Las Vegas
Racing drivers from Nevada
Sportspeople from Las Vegas